James Herman Olthuis (born 1938) is an interdisciplinary scholar in ethics, hermeneutics, philosophical theology, as well as a theorist and practitioner of psychotherapy of a kind he calls "relational psychotherapy".

Life
Olthuis studied under H. Evan Runner in philosophy at Calvin College, Grand Rapids, Michigan; then in theology at Calvin Theological Seminary; and finally in philosophical ethics at VU University, Amsterdam, where he received his Doctor of Philosophy degree under  in 1968. Olthuis analyzed and critiqued the works of G. E. Moore, his dissertation being entitled Facts, Values, and Ethics: A Confrontation with 20th Century British Moral Philosophy.

Positions held
Olthuis was a senior member at the Institute for Christian Studies in Toronto from 1968 to 2004 and continues to hold an emeritus position there.

Bibliography
(1968) Facts, Values and Ethics
(1975) I Pledge You My Troth
(1986) Keeping our Troth: Staying in Love During the Five Stages of Marriage
(1987) A Hermeneutics of Ultimacy
(1997) Knowing Other-wise: Philosophy on the Threshold of Spirituality, ed.
(2000) Towards an Ethics of Community, ed.
(2002) Religion With/out Religion: The Prayers and Tears of John D. Caputo, ed.
(2003) The Beautiful Risk: A New Psychology of Loving and Being Loved
(2005) Radical Orthodoxy and the Reformed Tradition: Creation, Covenant, and Participation, ed. with James K.A. Smith

Works about Olthuis
(2006) The Hermeneutics of Charity: Interpretation, Selfhood, and Postmodern Faith

See also
 Deconstruction
 List of thinkers influenced by deconstruction
 Postmodern theology
 Radical orthodoxy

References

Living people
American Christian theologians
Canadian Christian theologians
Calvin University alumni
Postmodernists
Hermeneutists
1938 births